Forrest Harrill "Smoky" Burgess (February 6, 1927 – September 15, 1991) was an American professional baseball catcher, pinch hitter, coach, and scout, who played in Major League Baseball (MLB) from  to . A nine-time All-Star, Burgess became known, later in his career, for his abilities as an elite pinch hitter, setting the MLB career record for career pinch-hits with 145. Burgess batted left-handed and threw right-handed.

Baseball career 
Born in Caroleen, North Carolina, Burgess was signed as an amateur free agent by the Chicago Cubs in 1944. In , he led the Tri-State League with a .387 batting average. He made his major league debut at the age of 22 with the Chicago Cubs on April 19, 1949. In October 1951, Burgess was traded to the Cincinnati Reds, who promptly traded him to the Philadelphia Phillies for catcher Andy Seminick before the start of the 1952 season. With the Phillies, he platooned alongside the right-handed-hitting Stan Lopata. Burgess had his best season in 1954, when he had a .368 batting average in 108 games for the Phillies, earning his first All-Star Game selection.

At the beginning of the 1955 season, Burgess was once again traded for Andy Seminick and returned to Cincinnati, where he finally got the chance to play every day. He rose to the occasion, hitting for a .306 batting average for the rest of the season along with 20 home runs and 77 runs batted in, gaining his second consecutive berth on the National League All-Star team. On July 29, 1955, Burgess hit three home runs and had nine runs batted in during a game against the Pittsburgh Pirates. He began the 1956 season as the Reds' starting catcher, but when the team faltered early in the season, Reds manager Birdie Tebbetts decided to shake things up, and replaced Burgess with a younger man, Ed Bailey.

In 1959, Burgess was traded along with Harvey Haddix and Don Hoak to the Pittsburgh Pirates for Frank Thomas, Whammy Douglas, Jim Pendleton and John Powers. He was the Pirates catcher on May 26, 1959 when Haddix took a perfect game into the 13th inning against the Milwaukee Braves, before losing the game. Burgess also won a World Series with the Pirates in 1960, batting .333 in the seven-game series.

By 1963, Jim Pagliaroni had taken over as the Pirates' starting catcher and in late 1964, Burgess was acquired by the Chicago White Sox, who were in the middle of a heated pennant race. In his first plate appearance with the White Sox, on September 15, against the Detroit Tigers, he hit a game-tying home run off pitcher Dave Wickersham. Over the next three years, Burgess was used almost exclusively as a pinch hitter, appearing in just 7 games behind the plate. In , he set a Major League record which still stands for the most games in a season (79) by a non-pitcher who did not score a run.

Burgess played his final major league game on October 1, 1967 at the age of 40.

Career statistics 
During an 18-year major league career, Burgess played in 1,691 games, hitting for a .295 career batting average, with 126 home runs, 673 RBI, and a .362 on-base percentage. He accumulated 1,318 career hits, with 230 doubles, and 33 triples. He walked 	477	times while striking out just 270 times. His .295 career batting average ranked him 10th among Major League catchers, as of 2009. A six-time All-Star, Burgess led National League (NL) catchers in fielding percentage three times, in 1953, 1960, and 1961. He recorded a career .988 fielding percentage. Along with Curt Simmons, he was the last player to formally retire, who had played in the major leagues in the 1940s (not counting Minnie Miñoso, who un-retired twice).

Post-playing career 
When his playing career ended, Burgess spent many years with the Atlanta Braves as a scout and minor league batting coach with the Pulaski Braves, in Pulaski, VA.

Burgess was inducted into the Cincinnati Reds Hall of Fame, in 1975.

Burgess was inducted into the North Carolina Sports Hall of Fame, in 1978.

Burgess died at age 64, in Rutherfordton, North Carolina, September 15, 1991, survived by his wife, Margaret and son, Larry, both of Forest City, NC.

See also

 Major League Baseball all-time pinch hit leaders

References

Further reading
 Observer staff (August 9, 1943). "Tigers Sign Caroleen Kid". The Charlotte Observer. p. 14 
 Observer staff (June 23, 1944). "Sparkling Carolinas All-Star Clubs: Sandlappers!; Tar Heels!". The Charlotte Observer. p. 24
 Associated Press (July 8, 1963). "Eddie Goostree Dead; Scouted Tiger Stars". The Boston Globe. p. 28

External links

Smoky Burgess at SABR (Baseball BioProject)
Smoky Burgess at The Deadball Era

 Smoky Burgess obituary at the New York Times
 "Catcher With A Belly", by Frank Yeutter, Baseball Digest, May 1953
 "Let Me Have Men About Me That Are Fat...", by Walter Bingham, Sports Illustrated, June 22, 1959
 "Catcher With The Highest Average", by Ed Rumill, Baseball Digest, December 1963
 "The Buddha with the Clutch Touch", by Francis Stan, Baseball Digest, July 1966

1927 births
1991 deaths
Baseball players from North Carolina
Major League Baseball catchers
National League All-Stars
Chicago Cubs players
Chicago White Sox players
Cincinnati Reds players
Philadelphia Phillies players
Pittsburgh Pirates players
Atlanta Braves scouts
Minor league baseball coaches
Lockport Cubs players
Portsmouth Cubs players
Los Angeles Angels (minor league) players
Fayetteville Cubs players
Macon Peaches players
Nashville Vols players
Springfield Cubs players
Baseball coaches from North Carolina
People from Caroleen, North Carolina